Homer High School is located in Homer, Alaska. It is part of the Kenai Peninsula Borough School District. The school's mascot is a mariner, usually represented by a wheel or sometimes an anchor.

Demographics

Ethnicity
According to the Kenai Peninsula Borough School District website, in 2010, the student body consisted of 320 Caucasian students, 22 Alaska Native students, 13 Hispanic students, 2 African American students, 11 Asian Pacific Islander students and 7 multi-ethnic students.

Income
According to the Kenai Peninsula Borough School District website, 39% of the students were classified as low income in 2010.

Sperm whale skeleton
There is a 41-foot sperm whale skeleton displayed in the commons of Homer High School. The skeleton was collected from East Chugach Island in 1988.

Facilities

Kate Kuhns Aquatic Center
Attached to Homer High School is the Kate Kuhns Aquatic Center, which has a 25-yard, 6-lane indoor pool. The facility also includes two low dives, a handicap access stairwell and a shallow-end splash slide.

Mariner Theater
The Mariner Theater is located adjacent to Homer High School's commons. Community and school sponsored productions take place at the theater.

References

External links
 Homer High School official website
 The Kate Kuhns Aquatic Center

Educational institutions established in 1957
Homer, Alaska
Public high schools in Alaska
Schools in Kenai Peninsula Borough, Alaska
1957 establishments in Alaska